Jezza may refer to:

 Jezža (crater), a crater in the Argyre quadrangle of Mars
 Alex Jesaulenko (born 1945), Australian rules footballer nicknamed Jezza
 Jezza, a nickname for people named Jeremy in Britain
Jeremy Clarkson (born 1960), English broadcaster, journalist and writer nicknamed Jezza
Jeremy Corbyn (born 1949), British politician and former leader of the Labour Party, nicknamed Jezza
Jeremy Kyle (born 1965), English radio and television presenter nicknamed Jezza
 Jezza Uepa, Nauruan powerlifting medalist in the 2011 Pacific Games
 Jezza Neumann, 2011 recipient of the Rory Peck Award
 Jezza Baron, squad member of the Philippine Fuego España F.C.
 Jezza, main character in the British children's TV series Barking!
 Jezza, a 1991 picture book illustrated by Kym Lardner

See also
 Ježa, a settlement in Ljubljana, Slovenia
 Jezza, a settlement near Kampala, Uganda
 Jez (nickname)
 Gazza (disambiguation)